The 1936–37 Scottish Division One season was won by Rangers by seven points over nearest rival Aberdeen. Dunfermline Athletic and Albion Rovers finished 19th and 20th respectively and were relegated to the 1937–38 Scottish Division Two.

League table

Results

References 

 Scottish Football Archive

1936–37 Scottish Football League
Scottish Division One seasons
Scot